Corematura chrysogastra is a moth of the subfamily Arctiinae. It was described by Perty in 1834. It is found in Ecuador, Bolivia and the Amazon region.

References

Arctiinae
Moths described in 1834